The All-Ukrainian Community is an electoral bloc in Ukraine. In the 30 September 2007 elections, the bloc failed to win parliamentary representation winning only 0,05% of the votes.

Member parties
The All-Ukrainian Community contains several parties:

All-Ukrainian Party of Peace and Unity
National-Democratic Association "Ukraine"
Conscience of Ukraine
Political Party of Small and Medium-sized Businesses of Ukraine

References 

Political party alliances in Ukraine